Safira Reski Ramadhanti Rumimper (born 28 December 1997) is an Indonesian goodwill ambassador for the Ministry of Environment and Forestry of Indonesia, TV commercial model and a beauty pageant titleholder who was appointed as Representative of Indonesia at Miss Earth 2020. She represented Indonesia at the Miss Earth 2020 pageant.

Early life and education 
Safira was born and raised in Manado, North Sulawesi to a Minahasan parents. She is a young beauty-entrepreneur who is also work with her own non-governmental organization called ”Desa Hijau”, an environmental ambassador organization and environmentalist in Indonesia, where she managed to bring  students in the rural area across Indonesian islands to understand the concern of planting trees and make the best use of everything in the environment. She has also been working as a volunteer towards promotion of eco-friendly management for Ministry of Environment and Forestry of Indonesia, where she was chosen as a goodwill ambassador.

Safira begin her career at the early age as a commercial model and model. Safira moved to Jakarta for her university studies. She holds a law degree from the University of Indonesia in Jakarta, graduated with Latin honours (summa cum laude), and now continuing her magister degree.

Pageantry

Miss Earth Indonesia 2020
Safira was appointed as Indonesia's representative at Miss Earth 2020 due to the pandemic caused by COVID-19 the coronation night of Miss Earth Indonesia 2020 was delayed after the final night of Miss Earth 2020 with Monica Khonado from Sulawesi Utara won the title of Miss Earth Indonesia 2020 and represented Indonesia in Miss Earth 2021.

Miss Earth 2020
Safira represented Indonesia at Miss Earth 2020 pageant that would be held via virtual coronation night on November 29, 2020, due to the pandemic caused by the Coronavirus disease 2019. Miss Earth 2019 Nellys Pimentel of Puerto Rico will crown her successor at the end of the event.

References

External links 
 

1998 births
Living people
Miss Earth 2020 contestants
University of Indonesia alumni
Indonesian female models
Indonesian beauty pageant winners
Indonesian Christians
People from Manado
Indo people
Minahasa people
Indonesian people of Dutch descent